¡Adios Amigos! (in Spanish, "Goodbye Friends") is the fourteenth and final studio album by American punk rock band Ramones. It was released on July 18, 1995, through Radioactive Records. The Ramones disbanded a year after its release and subsequent tour.

Background
The album was recorded at Baby Monster Studios in New York City, and was the band's third album on Radioactive Records after leaving Sire due to lack of significant sales and chart success. Relations within the band were strained, due to Joey Ramone's deteriorating health—having been diagnosed with Non-Hodgkin lymphoma—Joey and Johnny Ramone’s decade-long feud and a burgeoning rift between Marky and C.J. Long-time friend Daniel Rey was once again recruited to produce, as he was liked by the entire band and knew how to provide a comfortable, pleasant experience for them in the studio.

Composition and songs
In his 2012 autobiography, Commando, Johnny Ramone awarded the album a "B+" grade, stating, "Some of our albums would have three or four really strong songs, and then the rest would be pretty weak. But on this one, even the lesser stuff is decent."

While bassist and songwriter Dee Dee Ramone had left the band following 1989's Brain Drain, ¡Adios Amigos! features six of his compositions, including three previously released: "The Crusher" was originally recorded for his 1989 debut solo album, Standing in the Spotlight (a rap album released under the name Dee Dee King), while "Making Monsters for My Friends" and "It's Not for Me to Know" were originally recorded for the 1994 album I Hate Freaks Like You, which he performed with I.C.L.C. ¡Adios Amigos! also contains cover versions of Tom Waits' "I Don't Want to Grow Up" and Johnny Thunders' "I Love You".

The American version of the album features a hidden track, "Spiderman", slightly different from the version the Ramones originally recorded for the Saturday Morning tribute album. The Japanese version and Captain Oi reissue of the album feature the bonus track "R.A.M.O.N.E.S.", originally recorded by Motörhead as a tribute to the Ramones on their 1991 album 1916.

Production and recording
Johnny Ramone stated that ¡Adios Amigos! had "perhaps the best of all the guitar sounds I ever got."

C.J. Ramone sings lead vocals on the album tracks "Makin Monsters for My Friends", "The Crusher", "Cretin Family" and "Scattergun", as well as the bonus track "R.A.M.O.N.E.S." Dee Dee Ramone makes his first appearance on a Ramones album since 1989 during the bridge of the closing track "Born to Die in Berlin", singing in German and recorded via telephone.

Artwork
The album cover of ¡Adios Amigos!, which features two Allosaurus wearing sombreros, is a digitally altered version of a painting by artist Mark Kostabi, named Enasaurs, which features the dinosaurs wearing yellow witch hats. Johnny Ramone added that the dinosaurs were "what we felt like." Kostabi's painting was in turn modified from a painting by George Geselschap.

The back cover shows the band tied and bound before being executed by a firing squad. Johnny said that he stipulated that the band not be photographed from the front, reasoning, "I was very protective of how we looked at that point, and some of us looked worse than others." He added, "I had asked that they put the name of the record company on the backs of the firing squad executing us, and they wouldn't go with that."

The sleeping Mexican man seated next to the band is their longtime road manager Monte Melnick. Melnick explained, "They'd always have a Mexican sleeping on the floor in the old cowboy movies so they thought it'd be a nice touch. Shooting the back cover was a gas. A lot of people hate the front though." According to Melnick, Marky Ramone loved the album, due to Daniel Rey's production, but thought the cover was "terrible". "I can relate to a little bit 'cos I felt like a dinosaur," said Johnny, "but I don't know where they fit in with the Mexican hats and all that."

Melnick explained that several of the Ramones' later album covers were designed by manager Gary Kurfirst, with no input from the band, due to a dispute over merchandising royalties. Kurfirst was an art collector and "would buy the art and stick it on the cover and figured it would increase the value of his painting."

Reception

Critical
¡Adios Amigos! received mixed to positive reviews and was viewed by many fans as a return to form for the band. Evelyn McDonnell of Entertainment Weekly gave the album an "A−", stating, "their blitzkrieg bop not only hasn't aged but is timelier than ever."

In a retrospective review for All Music, Stephen Thomas Erlewine gave the album two and a half stars out of five, calling it "an admirable way to bow out." He added that it recaptured some of the inspiration of Too Tough to Die and was an improvement upon their previous two albums Brain Drain and Mondo Bizarro, but also veered close to self parody. Ultimately, he concluded that it "was the right way to call it a day—it rocks and it rolls, and it's not an embarrassment."

Commercial
In contrast to the Ramones' long-running inability to break through on singles charts, the band's cover of Tom Waits' "I Don't Want to Grow Up" became a minor hit for the group, breaching the top 40 of Billboards Modern Rock Tracks chart and peaking at No. 30.

Track listing

Personnel
Ramones
 Joey Ramone – lead vocals (tracks 1, 3, 5–7, 9, 11–13 and "Spiderman"), backing vocals (track 4)
 Johnny Ramone – guitars
 Marky Ramone – drums
 C.J. Ramone – bass; lead vocals (tracks 2, 4, 8, 10 and "R.A.M.O.N.E.S.")

Additional musicians
 Daniel Rey – lead guitar
 Dee Dee Ramone – co-lead vocals (track 13)

Technical
 Daniel Rey – producer
 Gary Kurfirst – executive producer
 Bryce Goggin – engineer
 Ian Bryan – assistant engineer
 Tom Lester – assistant engineer
 George Marino – mastering
 Tim Stedman – art direction, design
 Jen Cohen – design
 Todd Gallopo – design
 George DuBose – photography
 Mark Kostabi – cover painting
 Ivory – additional paintings

Charts

Album

Singles

References

1995 albums
Ramones albums
Albums produced by Daniel Rey
Chrysalis Records albums
Radioactive Records albums